Costigliole d'Asti is a small Italian town  in the Province of Asti, southern Piedmont. The name derives from the Latin .

The neighbouring communes are Agliano Terme, Antignano, Calosso, Castagnole delle Lanze, Isola d'Asti, Montegrosso d'Asti, and San Martino Alfieri (in the Province of Asti); and Castiglione Tinella and Govone (in the Province of Cuneo).

Wine
Costigliole d'Asti is particularly known for its viticulture.

Red wines
The main grape varieties grown are Barbera, Dolcetto, Grignolino, Freisa and Brachetto. The Denominazione di Origine Controllata (DOC) wines produced from these are:
Barbera d'Asti
Barbera del Monferrato
Piemonte Barbera
Monferrato Dolcetto
Freisa d'Asti
Grignolino d'Asti
Piemonte Brachetto

White wines
The Moscato Bianco grape is grown for the production of three Denominazione di Origine Controllata e Garantita (DOCG) or DOC wines:
Moscato d'Asti DOCG
Asti DOCG
Piemonte Moscato passito DOC

The Cortese and Chardonnay varieties are used for two DOC wines:
Piemonte Cortese
Piemonte Chardonnay

International relations

Twin towns – Sister cities
  Weinsberg, Germany; twinned since 2000

References

External links
 Official website

Cities and towns in Piedmont